"Let's Get Ready to Rhumble" is a 1994 song by PJ & Duncan AKA, the performing name used by British duo Ant & Dec at the time. The song was released in the United Kingdom on 11 July 1994 as the third single from their debut studio album Psyche. The song was written by Nicky Graham, Deni Lew and Mike Olton, and produced by Nicky Graham. It peaked at number 9 in the UK Singles Chart in 1994, and was later #1 almost two decades after its original chart appearance.  The song includes a repeatedly-used sample of boxing and wrestling announcer Michael Buffer saying his trademark catchphrase. “Rumble” was deliberately spelled as "rhumble" to avoid copyright problems, since Buffer had trademarked the phrase, and the chosen additional “h” was a homage to the rhumba dance. 

The single was re-released in March 2013, with royalties from sales donated to the charity ChildLine. The song peaked at number one on the UK Singles Chart in its first week of new release, becoming their first ever single to reach that spot and gave DMG TV's Edsel label a number one. The song was performed on Ant & Dec's Saturday Night Takeaway. The single was re-released in February 2014.

Chart performance
On 23 July 1994, the song entered the UK Singles Chart at number 18, it climbed seven places to number 11 in its second week and climbed to number 9 in its third week. After Ant & Dec performed the song on Saturday Night Takeaway on 23 March 2013, the song topped the UK Singles Chart on 31 March 2013, as predicted after charting at number one in the Midweek Chart Update on 27 March 2013.

Live performances
"Let's Get Ready to Rhumble" was performed on BBC One's Top of the Pops and regularly featured on the ITV Saturday morning show Gimme 5 at the time of release.

Ant & Dec celebrated the 100th episode of CD:UK in 2000 by performing the song once again, years after retiring from the music industry, after a viewer vote where 86% requested it. In March 2013, Ant & Dec performed the song as the closing act for the "End of the Show Show" segment of their ITV show Ant & Dec's Saturday Night Takeaway at the end of a series of performances by The Big Reunion special invitees. In the segment, Blue, Atomic Kitten and Five also performed.

Track listing

Personnel
 Vocals – PJ & Duncan/Ant & Dec
 Producers – Nicky Graham
 Lyrics – Nicky Graham, Deni Lew, Mike Olton
 Label: Telstar
 Max Headroom Ft MXHM

Charts

Weekly charts

Year-end charts

Release history

References

1994 singles
2013 singles
Ant & Dec songs
UK Singles Chart number-one singles
Songs written by Deni Lew
Pop-rap songs
1994 songs
Songs written by Nicky Graham
Telstar Records singles